Christopher Bolduc (born March 12, 1980) is an American operatic baritone. A national semi-finalist in the 2007 and 2008 Metropolitan Opera National Council Auditions, first prize winner in the 2009 Sullivan Foundation competition and 2011 recipient of a $50,000 grant from the Annenberg Foundation, Bolduc made his Metropolitan Opera debut in 2013 in Nico Muhly's opera Two Boys and currently sings leading roles in the opera houses of Europe and North America.

Early life and education
Bolduc was born in Albany, New York, and graduated from the State University of New York at Purchase with a Bachelor of Music and from the Indiana University School of Music with both a Master of Music and honorary Performer's Certificate. He then attended the Academy of Vocal Arts in Philadelphia where he met his current voice teacher Bill Schuman. He apprenticed first with Santa Fe Opera before making professional debuts at Central City Opera, Palm Beach Opera and Fort Worth Opera. In 2010, Bolduc joined Theater Basel's Oper Avenir program which led to many opportunities in the European opera houses.

Repertoire

Opera

Oratorio and sacred music

Awards
 Grant Recipient, Annenberg Foundation, 2011
 First Place, Sullivan Foundation, 2009
 Second Place, El Concurso Internacional de Canto Julián Gayarre, 2008
 Second Place, Gerda Lissner Foundation, 2008
 First Place, Florida Grand Opera Competition, 2007

References

External links

Christopher Bolduc Operabase

1980 births
Living people
Musicians from Albany, New York
American operatic baritones
State University of New York at Purchase alumni
Jacobs School of Music alumni
Winners of the Metropolitan Opera National Council Auditions
Classical musicians from New York (state)
21st-century American male singers
21st-century American singers